Little Falls is a township in Passaic County, in the U.S. state of New Jersey. The township was named for a waterfall on the Passaic River at a dam near Beattie Mill.

As of the 2020 United States census, the township's population was 13,360, a decrease of 1,072 (−7.4%) from the 2010 census count of 14,432, which in turn reflected an increase of 3,577 (+33.0%) from the 10,855 counted in the 2000 census.

History
Little Falls traces its first European settlement to 1711 when seven Bergen Dutch settlers banded together to begin farming.

The Morris Canal, once an important artery of trade and transportation until 1925 between the Delaware and Hudson rivers, wound its way through the township and vestiges of it still remain, some parts of which are a greenway.

Little Falls was incorporated as a township by an act of the New Jersey Legislature on April 2, 1868, from portions of Acquackanonk Township. On March 25, 1914, portions of the township were taken to form the borough of West Paterson (now Woodland Park).

Geography
According to the United States Census Bureau, the township had a total area of 2.87 square miles (7.43 km2), including 2.80 square miles (7.24 km2) of land and 0.07 square miles (0.19 km2) of water (2.54%).

Singac (with a 2010 Census population of 3,618) is an unincorporated community and census-designated place (CDP) located within Little Falls Township.

The township has three main sub-divisions. Great Notch is the easternmost part of Little Falls. The downtown area is frequently referred to as "The Center of Town", mainly by longtime residents, and is usually referred to as simply Little Falls. Singac is in the westernmost portion of the township.  Much of Singac borders the Passaic River.

Little Falls is bordered by the municipalities of Clifton, Totowa, Wayne, and Woodland Park in Passaic County, and Cedar Grove, Fairfield, Montclair, and North Caldwell in Essex County.

Demographics

2010 census

The Census Bureau's 2006–2010 American Community Survey showed that (in 2010 inflation-adjusted dollars) median household income was $78,318 (with a margin of error of +/− $8,244) and the median family income was $92,462 (+/− $12,925). Males had a median income of $67,585 (+/− $7,860) versus $42,270 (+/− $3,385) for females. The per capita income for the borough was $34,505 (+/− $3,336). About 4.7% of families and 6.0% of the population were below the poverty line, including 8.1% of those under age 18 and 10.2% of those age 65 or over.

Same-sex couples headed 42 households in 2010, an increase from the 33 counted in 2000.

2000 census
As of the 2000 United States census there were 10,855 people, 4,687 households, and 2,873 families residing in the township. The population density was 3,941.8 people per square mile (1,524.1/km2). There were 4,797 housing units at an average density of 1,742.0 per square mile (673.5/km2). The racial makeup of the township was 92.13% white, 0.65% African American, 0.06% Native American, 4.20% Asian, 0.02% Pacific Islander, 1.33% from other races, and 1.60% from two or more races. Hispanic or Latino of any race were 5.33% of the population.

There were 4,687 households, out of which 22.9% had children under the age of 18 living with them, 49.1% were married couples living together, 9.4% had a female householder with no husband present, and 38.7% were non-families. 33.1% of all households were made up of individuals, and 13.3% had someone living alone who was 65 years of age or older. The average household size was 2.32 and the average family size was 2.99.

In the township, the population was spread out, with 18.1% under the age of 18, 6.6% from 18 to 24, 32.4% from 25 to 44, 24.9% from 45 to 64, and 17.9% who were 65 years of age or older. The median age was 41 years. For every 100 females, there were 89.7 males. For every 100 females age 18 and over, there were 87.4 males.

The median income for a household in the township was $58,857, and the median income for a family was $70,223. Males had a median income of $49,136 versus $37,727 for females. The per capita income for the township was $33,242. About 2.8% of families and 4.6% of the population were below the poverty line, including 4.8% of those under age 18 and 4.9% of those age 65 or over.

Sports
The New Jersey Jackals of the Frontier League play at Yogi Berra Stadium, located in Little Falls on the campus of Montclair State University.

Government

Local government
Effective January 1, 2005, the form of government in Little Falls was changed (based on the results of a public referendum passed in November 2003) to the Mayor-Council form authorized by the Faulkner Act. The township is one of 71 (of the 564) municipalities statewide that use this form of government. The governing body is comprised of the Mayor and the five-member Township Council. Voters directly elect the mayor and the five township council members to four-year terms of office on a staggered basis, with either three seats or two seats (together with the mayoral seat) up for election in even-numbered years as part of the November general election. For most of its history, until 2003, Little Falls had been governed under the Township form of government by a township committee consisting of five committee members elected by the voters. Under this system, a chairman (mayor) and deputy-chair (deputy mayor) were selected annually by the Township Committee members.

, the mayor of Little Falls is Democrat James Belford Damiano, whose term of office ends December 31, 2024. Members of the Township Council are Council President Anthony Sgobba (D, 2024), Christine Hablitz (D, 2024), Michael Murphy (R, 2026), Jayna Patel (R, 2026), and Christopher Vancheri (D, 2026).

In January 2017, Democrat Chris Vancheri was appointed to fill the council seat expiring in December 2018 that was vacated by James Damiano when he took office as mayor. In April 2017, Republican Marc Benitez was appointed to fill a vacant seat expiring in December 2018 that had been held by Joseph Maceri until he resigned after moving out of the township. In the November 2018 general election, Vancheri was elected to serve the balance of the term of office and Democrat Tanya Seber defeated Benitez for the unexpired seat. When Seber and Vancheri were sworn into office, it marked the first time in township history that all of the township's elected officials were Democrats.

Post (who returned to using her maiden name of Conti as of January 2015) won election to a full four-year term as mayor in the 2012 general election, along with all three of her Republican running mates for Township Council; Louis Fontana, Pamela Porter, and Joseph Rento (who won the balance of an unexpired term of office).

Federal, state and county representation
Little Falls is located in the 11th Congressional District and is part of New Jersey's 40th state legislative district.

 

Passaic County is governed by Board of County Commissioners, comprised of seven members who are elected at-large to staggered three-year terms office on a partisan basis, with two or three seats coming up for election each year as part of the November general election in a three-year cycle. At a reorganization meeting held in January, the board selects a Director and Deputy Director from among its members to serve for a one-year term. 
, Passaic County's Commissioners are 
Director Bruce James (D, Clifton, term as commissioner ends December 31, 2023; term as director ends 2022),
Deputy Director Cassandra "Sandi" Lazzara (D, Little Falls, term as commissioner ends 2024; term as deputy director ends 2022),
John W. Bartlett (D, Wayne, 2024),
Theodore O. "T.J." Best Jr. (D, Paterson, 2023),
Terry Duffy (D, West Milford, 2022),
Nicolino Gallo (R, Totowa, 2024) and 
Pasquale "Pat" Lepore (D, Woodland Park, 2022).
Constitutional officers, elected on a countywide basis are
County Clerk Danielle Ireland-Imhof (D, Hawthorne, 2023),
Sheriff Richard H. Berdnik (D, Clifton, 2022) and 
Surrogate Zoila S. Cassanova (D, Wayne, 2026).

Politics
As of March 2011, there were a total of 7,632 registered voters in Little Falls, of which 2,084 (27.3% vs. 31.0% countywide) were registered as Democrats, 1,800 (23.6% vs. 18.7%) were registered as Republicans and 3,745 (49.1% vs. 50.3%) were registered as Unaffiliated. There were 3 voters registered as Libertarians or Greens. Among the township's 2010 Census population, 52.9% (vs. 53.2% in Passaic County) were registered to vote, including 61.3% of those ages 18 and over (vs. 70.8% countywide).

In the 2012 presidential election, Democrat Barack Obama received 52.9% of the vote (3,190 cast), ahead of Republican Mitt Romney with 46.1% (2,780 votes), and other candidates with 1.0% (62 votes), among the 6,086 ballots cast by the township's 9,118 registered voters (54 ballots were spoiled), for a turnout of 66.7%. In the 2008 presidential election, Republican John McCain received 2,908 votes (49.5% vs. 37.7% countywide), ahead of Democrat Barack Obama with 2,734 votes (46.5% vs. 58.8%) and other candidates with 65 votes (1.1% vs. 0.8%), among the 5,879 ballots cast by the township's 7,835 registered voters, for a turnout of 75.0% (vs. 70.4% in Passaic County). In the 2004 presidential election, Republican George W. Bush received 2,994 votes (50.6% vs. 42.7% countywide), ahead of Democrat John Kerry with 2,723 votes (46.0% vs. 53.9%) and other candidates with 47 votes (0.8% vs. 0.7%), among the 5,921 ballots cast by the township's 7,798 registered voters, for a turnout of 75.9% (vs. 69.3% in the whole county).

In the 2013 gubernatorial election, Republican Chris Christie received 60.7% of the vote (2,165 cast), ahead of Democrat Barbara Buono with 38.0% (1,355 votes), and other candidates with 1.2% (44 votes), among the 3,615 ballots cast by the township's 9,689 registered voters (51 ballots were spoiled), for a turnout of 37.3%. In the 2009 gubernatorial election, Republican Chris Christie received 1,936 votes (51.3% vs. 43.2% countywide), ahead of Democrat Jon Corzine with 1,577 votes (41.8% vs. 50.8%), Independent Chris Daggett with 183 votes (4.8% vs. 3.8%) and other candidates with 39 votes (1.0% vs. 0.9%), among the 3,775 ballots cast by the township's 7,552 registered voters, yielding a 50.0% turnout (vs. 42.7% in the county).

Education
For public school, students in pre-kindergarten through eighth grade are educated by the Little Falls Township Public Schools. As of the 2018–19 school year, the district, comprised of three schools, had an enrollment of 865 students and 94.6 classroom teachers (on an FTE basis), for a student–teacher ratio of 9.1:1. Schools in the district (with 2018–19 enrollment data from the National Center for Education Statistics) are 
Little Falls School #2 with 301 students in grades Pre-K–2, 
Little Falls School #3 with 184 students in grades 3–4 and 
Little Falls School #1 with 376 students in grades 5–8.

For ninth through twelfth grades, students in public school attend Passaic Valley Regional High School, which also serves students from Totowa and Woodland Park. The school facility is located in Little Falls. As of the 2018–19 school year, the high school had an enrollment of 1,186 students and 102.0 classroom teachers (on an FTE basis), for a student–teacher ratio of 11.6:1. Seats on the high school district's nine-member board of education are allocated based on the population of the constituent municipalities, with three seats each assigned Little Falls, Totowa and Woodland Park.

Most of Montclair State University is located in Little Falls. During 2011, the university employed 66 residents on a full or part-time basis, who earned almost $3.5 million in total compensation.

Transportation

Roads and highways

Little Falls is crisscrossed by several major roadways, including U.S. Route 46 and New Jersey Route 23. The Garden State Parkway and Interstate 80 run near the municipality. There are numerous crossings of the Upper Passaic River in town.

Public transportation
The Little Falls station and Montclair State University station of NJ Transit both serve Little Falls, offering service on the Montclair-Boonton Line to Hoboken Terminal in Hoboken, or from Montclair State University Station on Midtown Direct trains to New York City's Pennsylvania Station in Midtown Manhattan via the Secaucus Junction. The township was formerly served by the Great Notch station until NJ Transit closed it in January 2010 because of low ridership.

NJ Transit bus transportation is offered to the Port Authority Bus Terminal in Midtown Manhattan on the 191, 194 and 195 routes. Newark, New Jersey, is served by routes 11 and 28 (on Saturdays and Sundays). Local routes are the 704 and 705 lines. In September 2012, as part of budget cuts, NJ Transit suspended service to Newark on the 75 line.

Notable people

People who were born in, residents of, or otherwise closely associated with Little Falls include:
 David Blaine (born 1973), illusionist
 Tommy Breen (born 1981), sideshow performer and impresario.
 Frank DeCaro (born 1962), author and television personality
 Bobby Marks (born 1973), former National Basketball Association assistant general manager of the Brooklyn Nets
 Lloyd B. Marsh (1893–1971), politician who served as Secretary of State of New Jersey and Chairman of the New Jersey Republican State Committee
 Kit McClure (born 1951), saxophonist, trombonist and bandleader
 Leonard Schoonmaker (1882–1950), fencer who competed in the individual foil and épée events at the 1920 Summer Olympics
 Franklin E. Sigler (1924–1995), U.S. Marine who was the recipient of the congressional Medal of Honor for his actions during the Battle of Iwo Jima
 Robert Crooks Stanley (1876–1951), former chairman and president of International Nickel Company, known for discovering the alloy Monel
 Grif Teller (1899–1993), artist known for his paintings for the Pennsylvania Railroad
 Lois Utz (1932–1986), children's author
 Vikki Ziegler (born ), lawyer and author who was the focus of the reality television show Untying the Knot

In popular culture
 A delicatessen on Main Street in Little Falls was featured in the episode "House Arrest" from the second season of television series The Sopranos.
 The township was well known for the Colonial Inn, a hotel and lounge where comedian Jackie Gleason performed stand-up in the 1930s.
 The township is also mentioned in the Jonas Brothers documentary Chasing Happiness (2019). The family moved there in 2005 and the brothers wrote many of the songs included on their first album in their Little Falls home.

References

External links

 
1868 establishments in New Jersey
Faulkner Act (mayor–council)
Populated places established in 1868
Townships in Passaic County, New Jersey